The Weldon Gin Company Historic District encompasses a historic cotton gin complex in Weldon, Arkansas.  With a history dating to 1833, the Weldon Gin Company was long a staple of the local economy.  Located in the center of the town at the junction of Weldon and Washington Streets, the company complex includes a main gin building, built in 1939, and four outbuildings.  The present mill was built to replace an earlier steam-powered mill after electricity was introduced to the area in the 1930s.

The complex was listed on the National Register of Historic Places in 2008.

See also
National Register of Historic Places listings in Jackson County, Arkansas

References

Historic districts on the National Register of Historic Places in Arkansas
Buildings and structures in Jackson County, Arkansas
National Register of Historic Places in Jackson County, Arkansas